Brennan Marcel Williams (born February 5, 1991) is an American professional wrestler and former American football player. He is currently signed to WWE, where he performs on the Raw brand under the ring name ma.çé, and is a member of Maximum Male Models.

Prior to beginning his professional wrestling career, Williams was drafted by the Houston Texans of the National Football League in the third round (89th overall) of the 2013 NFL Draft. He played college football at North Carolina.

Early life
Williams was born in North Easton, Massachusetts and attended Catholic Memorial School.

While at Catholic Memorial, Williams was a member of PrepStars High School All-America team, a member of the "Super 26" team in 2008, an all-scholastic by the Boston Globe and Boston Herald. He was named all-conference as both a junior and senior. He was rated as the eighth best offensive lineman in the country by SuperPrep All-America. Rivals.com rated him the seventh best offensive guard in the country. Scout.com rated him as the 15th best offensive lineman in the country. ESPN.com rated him the 35th best offensive tackle in the country. He was also a member of the Rivals 250. He also played in the U.S. Army All-American Bowl.

On February 15, 2014, Williams's number 73 was retired by Catholic Memorial.

Football career

College
Williams received an athletic scholarship to attend the University of North Carolina at Chapel Hill, where he played for the North Carolina Tar Heels football team from 2009 to 2012. As a senior in 2012, he received honorable mention All-Atlantic Coast Conference (ACC) honors. Williams tore his labrum his senior year of college. Williams majored in communications while attending North Carolina.

Professional

Houston Texans
The Houston Texans selected Williams in the third round with the 89th overall pick of the 2013 NFL Draft. He would go on to miss his rookie season with a microfracture in his knee. On July 21, 2014, he was released.

Jacksonville Jaguars
On February 20, 2015, Williams was signed by the Jacksonville Jaguars, to a two-year contract, with the intention of being a backup to starter Jeremy Parnell. On August 29, 2015, Williams was released by Jacksonville.

New England Patriots
On October 20, 2015, the New England Patriots signed Williams to their practice squad. They waived him two days later.

Professional wrestling career

Reality of Wrestling (2016)
After being released by the Patriots, Williams returned to Houston to train to become a professional wrestler under the tutelage of WWE star Booker T. He made his debut with Booker's Reality of Wrestling promotion on February 1, 2016, under the ring name of Marcellus Black.

WWE

Early appearances (2016–2020) 
On February 11, 2016, Williams participated in a WWE try-out at the WWE Performance Center in Orlando, Florida. On August 1, 2016, WWE officially announced the signing of Williams, who started training at the Performance Center the same day. He made his in-ring debut for the company at a NXT live event in Orlando, Florida on September 30, 2016, competing in a battle royal.

In June 2019, Brennan was given the new ring name, Dio Maddin. However, on September 10, 2019, Maddin joined the commentary team for 205 Live, replacing Nigel McGuinness. Later that same month, WWE announced as part of their "Premiere Week" that the commentary teams would be changed, with Maddin becoming an analyst for the Raw commentary team with Vic Joseph and Jerry Lawler. His work as commentator ended in November 2019, when he was sent back to NXT to train. His absence was explained when, on the November 4, 2019 edition of Monday Night Raw, Maddin was attacked by Brock Lesnar who performed an F-5 on Maddin through the announcer's table.

Retribution and Maximum Male Models (2020–present) 

On the September 21, 2020 episode of Raw, he made his main roster debut now as a wrestler, he was revealed as a member of the villainous stable Retribution, under the ring name Mace, with a mask, new outfit, and sporting a noticeably lighter and more defined physique. On the October 5 episode of Raw, Mustafa Ali revealed as the stable's leader. At Fastlane on March 21, 2021, Mace and T-Bar attacked Ali, disbanding the stable. On the April 12 episode of Raw, Mace and T-Bar attacked Drew McIntyre. The following week on Raw, Mace was finally unmasked along with T-Bar in a tag team match against McIntyre and Braun Strowman, in which Mace and T-Bar won by disqualification. Later in an interview, they confirmed the start of their tag team run.

As part of the 2021 Draft, Mace was drafted to the SmackDown brand while T-Bar remained on the Raw brand, thus disbanding the team. On the November 26, 2021 episode of SmackDown, he competed in a Black Friday Invitational battle royal, where the winner would become the #1 contender for the Universal Championship, but was eliminated by Madcap Moss.

On the April 15, 2022 episode of SmackDown, Mace returned in a dark segment as LA Knight's first acquisition under Knight Model Management. Following the announcement, Mace defeated Erik of The Viking Raiders in a dark match. On the July 1 episode of SmackDown, Knight, now known as Max Dupri, announced Mace and Mansoor, under the tweaked names "ma.çé" and "mån.sôör", as his new tag team, Maximum Male Models. ma.çé and Maximum Male Models joined Raw brand on February 6, 2023.

Personal life
Williams is the son of Jacquelyn and former NFL defensive end Brent Williams. He has three children with his wife Ciarra. His brother Cam played as a linebacker for Ohio State, and is currently a scout for the New England Patriots.
His younger sister Jaylen, a former basketball player at Penn State, signed with the WWE on August 19, 2021. 
Williams was a fan of professional wrestling growing up, having cited Eddie Guerrero and The Great Muta as some of his favorites. He is also a fan of video games, anime and manga.

Other media

Williams has appeared in various streams on the tabletop role-playing YouTube channel The Third Wheel, most notably in the role of The Batsu Sama, the scariest person in the world. He joined the main series of the channel "Thrilling Intent", as a steely assassin named Harlock, with a bionic arm and a love for traps, as well as another series on the channel, No Smarts But Hearts, where he plays the prestigious Clover Von Krone, a warm-natured, but incredibly strong member with the elite Adventurer Knights. He also appears on several series on the tabletop role-playing channel Stabbyness, in "Forgotten Indigo", "Carbon Interface", and "Reflection".

Williams took part in multiple collaborations with the YouTube channel Super Best Friends Play, where he earned the nickname "Better Woolie" for his resemblance to group member Woolie Madden, from which his name change to Dio Maddin is partly derived. He also appeared in a Minecraft Wrestling Show called "Minecraft Wrestling Alliance".

He has also done voice-over/narration for various videos, such as "Jojo's Bizarre Adventure Part 2" by Did You Know Anime, and "Welcome to YouTube Comments (2016) - Part 1" by JelloApocalypse.

On February 3, 2021, Williams re-launched his YouTube channel as a VTuber under the name JiBo.

Awards and accomplishments 
 Pro Wrestling Illustrated
Ranked No. 211 of the top 500 singles wrestlers in the PWI 500 in 2021
 WrestleCrap
 Gooker Award (2020) – 
 Wrestling Observer Newsletter
 Worst Gimmick (2022) as part of Maximum Male Models

References

External links
 
 North Carolina Tar Heels bio
 Houston Texans bio
 Jacksonville Jaguars bio
 New England Patriots bio
 The Third Wheel
 
 

1991 births
Living people
American football offensive tackles
American football offensive guards
North Carolina Tar Heels football players
Houston Texans players
Jacksonville Jaguars players
Players of American football from Massachusetts
People from Easton, Massachusetts
Sportspeople from Greater Boston
American male professional wrestlers
American YouTubers
New England Patriots players
Catholic Memorial School alumni
African-American male professional wrestlers
21st-century African-American sportspeople
VTubers
21st-century professional wrestlers